, better known as , is a Japanese actor, entertainer, and model who is represented by LesPros Entertainment.

Yuji graduated from Jiyu no Mori Gakuen High School.

Filmography

TV series

Dramas

Films

References

External links
 

1987 births
Living people
21st-century Japanese male actors
Japanese male film actors
Japanese male models
Japanese male television actors
Japanese people of American descent
Japanese television personalities